The Hazelden Betty Ford Foundation is an addiction treatment and advocacy organization that was created in 2014 with the merger of the Minnesota-based Hazelden Foundation and the Betty Ford Center in Rancho Mirage, California in the United States.

The organizations have a long history together.  Hazelden was founded in 1949, and Betty Ford herself visited its Minnesota headquarters in 1982 when she was planning to open the facility in Rancho Mirage.

The Hazelden Betty Ford Foundation bases its residential and outpatient services on a Twelve Step, abstinence-based treatment model for individuals with addiction to alcohol and other drugs.

The Foundation also includes the nation's largest addiction and recovery publishing house, a fully accredited graduate school of addiction studies, an addiction research center, prevention training and an education arm for medical professionals, family members and other loved ones, as well as a children's program.

See also
 Betty Ford Center

References

External links 
 Hazelden Betty Ford Foundation

Organizations established in 2014
Addiction organizations in the United States
Mental health organizations in Minnesota
2014 establishments in Minnesota